Craig Barbary (born 11 July 1960) is  a former Australian rules footballer who played with Essendon in the Victorian Football League (VFL).

Notes

External links 
		
Craig Barbary's profile at Essendonfc.com

Living people
1960 births
Australian rules footballers from Victoria (Australia)
Essendon Football Club players